Herbert Wilkinson (2 August 1922 – 9 July 2011) was an English footballer who made 39 appearances in the Football League playing for Lincoln City. He also played non-league football for Murton Colliery Welfare and Frickley Colliery, and in the Midland League with Grantham. He played as a full back.

Wilkinson was married to Teresa and had two children. His son-in-law Graham Clapham and grandson Jamie Clapham also played football professionally.

References

1922 births
2011 deaths
Footballers from Sunderland
English footballers
Association football fullbacks
Murton A.F.C. players
Lincoln City F.C. players
Frickley Athletic F.C. players
Grantham Town F.C. players
English Football League players
Midland Football League players